Jerzy Pawłowski (born 2 June 1935) is a Polish rower. He competed in the men's coxed four event at the 1964 Summer Olympics.

References

External links
 

1935 births
Living people
Polish male rowers
Olympic rowers of Poland
Rowers at the 1964 Summer Olympics
People from Radzyń Podlaski